Plympton is a suburb of the city of Plymouth in Devon, England. It is in origin an ancient stannary town. It was an important trading centre for locally mined tin, and a seaport before the River Plym silted up and trade moved down river to Plymouth and was the seat of Plympton Priory the most significant local landholder for many centuries.

Plympton is an amalgamation of several villages, including St Mary's, St Maurice, Colebrook, Woodford, Newnham,  and Chaddlewood.

Fore Street, the town's main street, is lined with mediaeval buildings, around thirty of which are either Grade II* or Grade II listed. The Grade II* buildings are The Old Rectory, the Guildhall and Tudor Lodge.

Toponymy
Although the name of the town appears to be derived from its location on the River Plym (compare, for instance, Otterton or Yealmpton), this is not considered to be the case. As J. Brooking Rowe pointed out in 1906, the town is not and never was sited on the river – rather it is sited on the ancient trackway called 'the Ridgeway' from Dartmoor. The earliest surviving documentary reference to the place is as Plymentun in Anglo-Saxon charter S380 dated to around 900 AD, and this name may be derived from the Old English adjective plymen, meaning "growing with plum-trees". So Plympton would have the meaning "Plum-tree farm". Alternatively, Cornish derivations also give ploumenn  meaning 'plum' and plo(b)m meaning 'lead' – possibly related to Latin plombum album ( 'British lead') or tin. The local civic association, however, suggests an unsupported alternative derivation from the Celtic Pen-lyn-dun ("fort at the head of a creek").

By the early 13th century, the River Plym was named from a back-formation from this name and nearby Plymstock. This later led to the naming of the fishing port created at the river's mouth (Plymouth, originally named Sutton) when the river estuary silted up too much for the monks to sail up river to Plympton any longer.

History
Nearby is the Iron Age hill fort of Boringdon Camp. Plympton is listed in the Domesday Book of 1086 as being held by the king (William the Conqueror), with 27 villagers, 12 smallholders and 6 slaves.

In the early 12th century Plympton was the site of an important priory founded by William Warelwast. The members were Augustinian canons and the priory soon became the second richest monastic house in Devon (after Tavistock). The gatehouse of the priory is still in existence. In 1872 it was recorded that the gatehouse, kitchen and refectory were still in good condition.

Richard de Redvers (died 1107) was granted the feudal barony of Plympton, based at Plympton Castle, by King Henry I (1100–1135), of whom he was a most trusted supporter. The de Redvers family later became Earls of Devon. Their lands, including Plympton, and titles were later inherited by the Courtenay family, feudal barons of Okehampton. The ancient Stannary town remains dominated by its now ruined Norman motte-and-bailey castle and it still retains a cohesive medieval street pattern. A number of historic buildings in the local vernacular style of green Devon slate, limestone and lime-washed walls, with Dartmoor granite detailing, attest to all periods of its history.

Before the Reform Act 1832 the town was one of the rotten boroughs, and sent two MPs to the unreformed House of Commons.

The town was the birthplace and early residence of the painter Sir Joshua Reynolds (1723–1792) who became the first president of the Royal Academy of Arts. He was mayor of Plympton in 1773. His father was headmaster of Plympton Grammar School which is a historic building in the centre of the town. Former pupils were Benjamin Haydon and Sir Charles Lock Eastlake, PRA, who were respectively first director of the National Gallery and first president of the Royal Photographic Society. Many of Reynold's paintings were purchased by his friends the Parker family of local Saltram House, now owned by the National Trust, and are still on public display there.

Architecture
Plympton has 68 listed buildings in the database of Historic England. Of these, one is Grade I (Plympton House, St Peter’s Convent), six are Grade II* and 61 are Grade II.

Historic estates
The manor of Boringdon in Colebrook was a seat of the Parker family formerly of North Molton, which later acquired Saltram.

Loughtor (after c.1718 renamed Newnham Park) was the seat of the Selman family, of whom several were MPs. William Selman II was five times MP for Plympton Erle between 1420 and 1429. The estate was later a minor seat of a cadet branch of the Courtenay family.

Newnham was a manor that was the seat of the Strode family, whose monuments exist in St Mary's Church.

Churches
Plympton has two churches. The Church of St Thomas at Plympton St Maurice (also known as the Church of St Maurice) is of Norman origin.

St Mary's church was dedicated in 1311 and was originally a parish chapel attached to Plympton Priory. It has two aisles on each side of the nave, the outer aisles being shorter than the inner ones. The tower, built of granite ashlar, is visible from afar. The south porch is ornamented with carving and has a lierne vault. The outer north aisle is the earliest part of the church and the rest is mainly of the 15th century, the south aisle being the latest part. There are monuments to the Strode family, including a tomb-chest for Richard Strode (died 1464), the effigy being clad in armour. The monument of William Strode (died 1637) and his family shows husband, two wives and ten children. There is also a monument of W. Seymour (died 1801) in Coade stone and of Viscount Boringdon, the 11-year-old heir to the Earl of Morley of Saltram House who died in Paris in 1817, by François-Nicolas Delaistre.

Modern Plympton
Between about 1990 and 2010 Plympton has seen considerable growth as the suburban population of Plymouth has doubled. To help manage this rapid growth more efficiently, Plympton has been separated into a series of separate districts: Yealmpstone, Plympton-St Maurice, Colebrook, Underwood, Woodford and Chaddlewood.

Public transport
Plympton has four main bus services: routes 20, 20A, 21 and 21A, which are operated by Plymouth Citybus and services 52 and 59, which are operated by Target Travel.

In the past, railway facilities were originally provided at Plympton – for goods traffic only – by the horse-drawn Plymouth and Dartmoor Railway, but their branch was closed and sold to the South Devon Railway to allow them to build a line from Exeter to Plymouth. A station was opened in the town on 15 June 1848. From 1 June 1904 it was the eastern terminus for enhanced Plymouth area suburban services but it was closed to passenger traffic from 3 March 1959 and all goods related traffic from June 1964.

In addition to this railway connected to the National rail network there is also The Plym Valley Railway which is a preserved railway based at the reconstructed Marsh Mills station on Coypool Road. This was formerly part of the GWR Plymouth to Launceston branch line. The volunteer-run PVR is actively rebuilding the line between Marsh Mills and Plymbridge. Steam and diesel heritage trains run on numerous Sundays throughout the year.

Plymouth City Council has stated it would like to see a rail station reopened on the London main line running through the middle of Plympton, which would provide quick and frequent trains into Plymouth. But there are major obstacles to providing such a service on a primarily inter-regional rail route, shown when Ivybridge – on the same line – got a new station in 1994. Plymouth city council support the reopening of the station to deal with bad traffic congestion in Eastern Plymouth. After a feasibility study in 2017, A Plymouth Joint plan was opened for consultation in 2018 which included a suggested 'Plymouth Metro' with a station at Plympton however, as of May 2020, nothing has been enacted.

Schools
Plympton has two state secondary schools serving pupils from ages 11–18. Both Plympton Academy and Hele's School attract students from the Plympton area and surrounding areas of Laira, Ivybridge and Dartmoor.

Sports
Amateur club Plympton Athletic F.C. are members of the Devon Football League South and West Division as of 2020. Their home is the Lee Moor Stadium.

Plympton Victoria Rugby Club are the local rugby team,

Events 
Plympton has hosted an annual fete called 'The Lamb Feast' for many years on the local Castle Green. A key part of Plympton's Midsummer Festival in mid June, the Lamb Feast and surrounding activities span over the weekend, organised by the Plympton Civic Association.

Notable residents
 Elizabeth Johnson, religious pamphleteer, born in Plympton in 1721
 Ellen Marriage, pioneer Balzac translator, and her husband Edmund Garrett, an Ibsen translator, lived here up to Garrett's death in 1907
 David Owen, former Foreign Secretary, born in Plympton
 Sir Joshua Reynolds, painter, born in Plympton
 Paul Rogers, actor, born in Plympton
 Sir Edwin Sandys, founded the colony of Jamestown, was an MP for Plympton
 Richard Strode, MP for Plympton, established Parliamentary privilege
 William Warelwast, buried here (in the priory)

References

External links

The Encyclopaedia of Plymouth History – Plympton Priory

 
Suburbs of Plymouth, Devon
Former towns in Devon
Former manors in Devon